Joint Task Force Caring Response was a United States multi-service humanitarian assistance and disaster relief effort for Burmese citizens devastated by recent Cyclone Nargis in 2008.

History
JTF Caring Response was led by Lieutenant General John F. Goodman of the U.S. Marine Corps.

During a delivery by MAG-36 supported by 36th Airlift Squadron on 19 May 2008 to Yangon International Airport in Burma approximately 15,000 pounds of water, water containers, rations, and mosquito netting were unloaded from a C-130 Hercules aircraft in direct support of VMGR-152. 

Expeditionary Strike Group 7/TF 76/31st Marine Expeditionary Unit was also standing by off the Myanmar coast in order to be ready to deliver aid should it be allowed to do so.

References

Humanitarian missions of the United States Air Force
Joint task forces of the United States Armed Forces
Military units and formations established in 2008